"You Can" is a 1981 single by Madleen Kane and produced by Giorgio Moroder. The song was written by Yolanda Yvette Adams, Donald Ray Atkins and Marcus Ecby.  Along with the track, "Fire in My Heart", "You Can" was Kane's most successful single on the dance charts, spending three weeks at number one.  The single was her only Hot 100 chart entry, peaking at #77.

Charts

Weekly charts

References

1981 singles
Song recordings produced by Giorgio Moroder
1981 songs